Lotus Gardens is a small suburb situated next to Atteridgeville in the west of Pretoria. 

Lotus Gardens, initially referred to as "Dairy Farm", was planned as an Indian township by the apartheid government, under the Group Areas Act, in order to relieve housing pressure in Laudium, and the first cohort of Indian residents moved in during the early 1990s, with children initially bused to schools in Laudium. However, by this time, segregated housing had been abolished, and Lotus Gardens became a mixed community, and by 2011, it had a population that was 80% black African. The township is separated from Atteridgeville  by the N4 Magalies Freeway. The two townships share a police station which is situated in Atteridgeville.

Schools

Lotus secondary School
Fusion High School
Ouma HS Abrahims Primary School
S.k Moseneke primary School
Bahale Primary School

References

Suburbs of Pretoria
Townships in Gauteng
Populated places established in 1990